Eleocharis tuberculosa, the cone-cup spikerush, is a plant species native to the United States and Canada. It has been reported from every state on the Gulf and Atlantic coasts from Maine to Texas, plus Kentucky, Tennessee, Arkansas and Nova Scotia. It is found in wet soil in meadows, woodlands, lake shores and river banks.

Eleocharis tuberculosa is a perennial herb forming dense clumps. Culms are elliptical in cross-section, up to 70 cm tall. Styles of pistillate flowers have a swollen base called a tubercule, white to pale orange-brown, often with red spots, up to 2.5 mm across.

References

tuberculosa
Flora of the United States
Flora of Nova Scotia
Plants described in 1817
Flora without expected TNC conservation status